Rex Bernice Baxter, Jr. (born February 28, 1936) is an American professional golfer who played on the PGA Tour and the Senior PGA Tour.

A native of Amarillo, Texas, Baxter won the U.S. Junior Amateur at Tulsa's Southern Hills Country Club in 1953. He attended the University of Houston, where he was an All-American member of the golf team and individually the 1957 NCAA national champion.

He won the Cajun Classic Open Invitational in 1963 and the PGA Professional National Championship in 1970. His best finish in a major is T-33 at the 1960 U.S. Open.

Baxter was inducted into the University of Houston Athletics Hall of Honor in 1971; he was the first member of the golf team to receive this honor. After his playing days on the PGA Tour were over, Baxter worked as a club pro at various clubs including Beechmont Country Club in Cleveland, Ohio, Glen Oaks Country Club on Long Island, High Ridge in Lantana, Florida, and as an instructor for Golf Digest Schools at PGA National in Palm Beach Gardens, Florida.

Amateur wins (5)
1953 U.S. Junior Amateur Golf Championship
1956 Missouri Valley Conference tournament (individual medalist)
1957 Missouri Valley Conference tournament (individual medalist), NCAA Championship, Trans-Mississippi Amateur

Professional wins (4)

PGA Tour wins (1)

Other wins (3)
1965 Waterloo Open Golf Classic
1966 Brazil Open
1970 PGA Professional National Championship

U.S. national team appearances
Amateur
Walker Cup: 1957 (winners)
Americas Cup: 1958 (winners)

Professional
Diamondhead Cup/PGA Cup: 1974 (winners), 1976 (winners)

References

External links

American male golfers
Houston Cougars men's golfers
PGA Tour golfers
PGA Tour Champions golfers
Golfers from Texas
Sportspeople from Amarillo, Texas
1936 births
Living people